Kentucky Route 1849 (KY 1849) is a  state highway in the U.S. State of Kentucky. Its western terminus is at KY 1230 in Louisville and its eastern terminus is at U.S. Route 31W (US 31W) and US 60 in Louisville.

Major junctions

References

1849
1849
Transportation in Louisville, Kentucky